Vishnuvardhana (r. 1108–1152 CE) was a king of the Hoysala Empire in what is today the modern state of Karnataka, India. He ascended the Hoysala throne after the death of his elder brother Veera Ballala I in c.1108. Originally a follower of Jainism and known as Bitti Deva, he came under the influence of the Hindu philosopher Ramanujacharya, converted to Hindu Vaishnavism and took the name "Vishnuvardhana". His queen Shanthala however remained a Jain. This was the transition period from Jainism to  Hinduism Vishnuvardhana took the first steps in creating an independent Hoysala Empire in South India through a series of battles against his overlord, the Western Chalukya King Vikramaditya VI, and the Chola Empire to the south. He recovered parts of Gangavadi province (modern southern Karnataka) from the hegemony of the Cholas in the battle of Talakad, and parts of Nolambavdi. According to historian Coelho, the Hoysalas gained the dignity of a kingdom due to the efforts of Vishnuvardhana, whose rule was packed with "glorious" military campaigns. According to historians Sen, Chopra et al., and Sastri, Vishnuvardhana was a "great soldier" and an "ambitious monarch".

Hoysala literature in the Kannada language began to proliferate under the patronage of Vishnuvardhana. The mathematician Rajaditya wrote Vyavaharaganita and Lilavati on mathematics. According to the historian E.P. Rice, the epic poet Nagachandra was under Vishnuvardhana's patronage when he wrote the earliest extant Ramayana (a Jain version) in the Kannada language called Ramachandra charita purana, and an epic on the nineteenth Jain Tirthankar titled Mallinathapurana.

Conquests

Wars in the South
Vishnuvardhana was the governor over parts of Gangavadi during the rule of his elder brother Veera Ballala I. After ascending the Hoysala throne, his first major conquest was that of the occupied Chola territories of Gangavadi in c.1116. According to the historian Kamath, the disgruntled Chola governor Adigaiman may have helped Vishnuvardhana in his conquest. Being a Vaishnava Hindu by faith, the Chola governor may not have been treated well by King Kulothunga Chola I. But Sastri claims Vishnuvardhana overwhelmed Adigaiman before gaining his support. By c.1117, Vishnuvardhana defeated the other rulers of the Nilgiri region, such as the  Chengalvas, the Kongalvas (resulting in his marriage to the Kongalva princess Chandaladevi, according to historian Derrett), and the Nidugal Chola ruler Irukkavela. According to Kamath, Vishnuvardhana's forces marched as far as Kanchi. The Nolambas of Nolambavadi, Kadambas of Banavasi and Goa (ruled by Jayakesi II), the Pandyas of Uchchangi (a small dynasty of rulers near the Tungabhadra), the Alupas of Tulunadu, and the Santaras of Hosagunda had to pay tribute and accept Vishnuvardhana as their overlord. Hoysala inscriptions of the period note Vishnuvardhana's conquest of the Nilgiris. The Chamarajanagara inscription gives details that his armies crossed the Nila mountains and proclaims him the "master of Kerala". According to the historians Chopra, Ravindran and Subhramanian, other records mention his temporary stay in Kanchi after his victories over the Cholas. Vishnuvardhana was responsible in part for the disruption to the Chola empire. With these victories, Vishnuvardhana assumed the titles Talakadugonda ("Lord of Talakad") and Nolambavadi gonda ("Lord of the Nolambas").

Wars against the Kalyani Chalukyas
After his successes in the south, Vishnuvardhana swiftly turned north with the intention of breaking free from his overlord, the great Western Chalukya King Vikramaditya VI. Between c.1117 and c.1120, Vishnuvardhana successfully dealt with the Chalukyan armies at Kannegala (c.1118), occupied a strategic fort at Hanagal, defeated the Chalukyan commander Boppanna at Hallur (c.1120) and spread his control over the Banavasi and Humacha regions. By c.1122, he had  reached the Krishna river. Here he was defeated by the powerful Sinda chief Achugi, a commander loyal to the Chalukya emperor. Vishnuvardhana thus had to accept, for the time being, subordination to the Chalukya throne. But he was not to be subdued for long. After the death of Vikarmaditya VI, the Hoysala monarch re-captured Hanagal, Uchchangi and Bankapura by c.1140 and marched north of the Tungabhadra river up to Lakkundi. The historian Majumdar claims Vishnuvardhana controlled areas in the Krishna river region even around c.1131 and performed the prestigious Tulapurusha ceremony, a symbol of sovereignty, despite his nominal subordination to the Chalukyas. Historians are divided over the year when Vishnuvardhana died. Sastri, S.K. Aiyangar and Desai are of the opinion he died in c.1152. But Kamath claims there is evidence the Vishnuvardhana died a little earlier because the Yalladahalli record of c.1145 proclaims his son Narasimha I the Hoysala monarch.

Architectural legacy
Vishnuvardhana was a great builder. To celebrate his success against the Cholas, he built the Keerthi Narayana temple at Talakad, and the spectacular Vijayanarayana temple at Belur (also called the Chennakesava Temple, dedicated to the Hindu god Vishnu). Around the same time, the Hoysaleswara Temple, more ornate than the one at Belur and dedicated to the Hindu god Shiva was consecrated. The temples of Belur and Halebidu are a proposed UNESCO world heritage sites. With in the Chennakesava temple complex is the smaller yet ornate Kappe Chennigaraya temple built by Vishnuvardhana's noted queen Shantaladevi.

References

Citations

Sources
 
 
 
 
 
 
 
 
 
 
 
 

1152 deaths
Hoysala kings
Hindu monarchs
Converts to Hinduism
Year of birth unknown
12th-century Indian monarchs
12th-century Hindus